Chewang is a town in Hejiang County, in southeastern Sichuan province, China, located on the eastern (right) bank of the Chishui River (赤水河), located upstream from the county seat, where that river joins the Yangtze, and downstream of Chishui City in Guizhou. , it has 1 residential community (社区) and 9 villages under its administration.

See also 
 List of township-level divisions of Sichuan

References 

Towns in Sichuan
Hejiang County